TFF 3. Lig (Turkish Football Federation Third League) is the fourth level in the Turkish football league system. It was founded in 2001–02 season as a continuation of then third level division Turkish Third Football League.

League format

Since 2010–11 season status of the league has been changed. The league is played with 55 teams in three groups. The winners of each group directly promotes to TFF Second League. In each group 2nd through 5th teams play promotion play-offs to determine second team to be promoted. Bottom three teams in each group are relegated to Turkish Regional Amateur League.

Seasons

1967–68 season

League was founded in 1967–68. In the first year 17 teams attended. Two teams relegated from Turkish Second Football League: Beyoğluspor, Davutpaşa. Tekirdağspor, Çanakkalespor, Çorumspor, Elazığspor, Muğlaspor, Düzcespor, Eskişehir Demirspor, Kırıkkalespor, Nazillispor, Konya İdman Yurdu, Tarsus İdman Yurdu, Ceyhanspor, Lüleburgazspor, Tekirdağspor, İskenderunspor, and Hatayspor were other teams whose applications were accepted by TFF. At the end of the season winner promoted to TFF Second League, no team relegated.

Promotion and relegation:

Promotion from amateur leagues:

1968–69 season

In 1968–69 new clubs joined: Amasyaspor, Burdurspor, Diyarbakırspor, Ispartaspor, Rizespor, Ankara Sanayi Barbaros. Two groups were formed on geographical basis: Red Group for East and White Group for West. Each group contained 14 teams and one best promoted and one worst relegated in each group.

Promotion and relegation:

Promotion from amateur leagues:

1969–70 season

Promotion and relegation:

Promotion from amateur leagues:

1970–71 season

Promotion and relegation:

1971–72 season

Promotion and relegation:

1972–73 season

Promotion and relegation:

1973–74 season

Promotion and relegation:

1974–75 season

Promotion and relegation:

1975–76 season

Promotion and relegation:

1976–77 season

Promotion and relegation:

1977–78 season

Promotion and relegation:

1978–79 season

Promotion and relegation:

1979–80 season
League was abandoned after the season. All of the teams promoted to 1980-81 Turkish Second Football League

Promotion and relegation:

1984–85 season
League was not played in 1980–81, 1981–82, 1982–83 and 1983–84 seasons. League was refounded after four seasons.

Promotion and relegation:

1985–86 season

Promotion and relegation:

1986–87 season

Promotion and relegation:

1987–88 season

Promotion and relegation:

1988–89 season

Promotion and relegation:

1989–90 season

TFF declared no relegation but announced that professional clubs will be represented only one team in all professional leagues.

Promotion and relegation:

1990–91 season

Promotion and relegation:

1991–92 season

Promotion and relegation:

1992–93 season

Promotion and relegation:

1993–94 season

Promotion and relegation:

1994–95 season

Promotion and relegation:

1995–96 season

Promotion and relegation:

1996–97 season

Promotion and relegation:

1997–98 season

Promotion and relegation:

1998–99 season

Promotion and relegation:

1999–2000 season

Promotion and relegation:

2000–01 season

Promotion and relegation:

Source: TFF. Turkish-Soccer archives and mackolik.com.

2001–02 season

Promotion and relegation:

2002–03 season

Promotion and relegation:

2003–04 season

Promotion from amateur leagues:

Promotion and relegation:

2004–05 season

Promotion from amateur leagues: İskenderun DÇ, Nevşehirspor, Hatay Köy Hizmetleri, Arsinspor, Karsspor, Mecidiyeköy, Yeni Burdur Gençlik, Aroma Akseki.

Promotion and relegation:

2005–06 season

Promotion from amateur leagues: Değirmenderespor, Gazi Belediyespor, Hopaspor, Afyonkarahisarspor, Nilüfer Belediyespor, Konya Şekerspor, Orhangazispor, Küçükçekmecespor.

Promotion and relegation:

2006–07 season

Promotion from amateur leagues: Belediye Vanspor, Bağlum Belediyespor, Sürmenespor, Bozüyükspor, Balıkesirspor, Tepecik Belediyespor, Orhangazi Gençlerbirliği.

Promotion and relegation:

2007–08 season

Promotion from amateur leagues: Körfez Belediyespor, Konya Şekerspor, Tavşanlı B TKİ Linyit, Torbalıspor, Bafra Belediyespor, Malatya Belediyespor, Bingöl Belediyespor.

Promotion and relegation:

2008–09 season

In 2008–09 season the league contained 51 clubs spread out over 5 groups with 10 or 11 clubs. The groups were determined in regions. The top two clubs from each group qualified to the Promotion Group. The remaining groups with other teams were called Classification Groups. Top four teams in Promotion Group are directly promoted to TFF Second League. The three teams classified 5th to 7th in Promotion Group join the extra play-offs with the top teams from each of the 5 Classifying Groups. These 8 teams play a knockout competition (in neutral venue) to determine the last two teams to be promoted. The bottom two teams of Classifying Groups are relegated to the Amateur Leagues.

Promotion from amateur leagues: Menemen Belediyespor, Bandırmaspor, Keçiören Belediyespor, TKİ Tavşanlı Linyitspor, Bağlar Vuralspor.

Promotion and relegation:

2009–10 season

In 2009–10 season league was played by 53 teams, 11 teams in groups 1–4 and 9 teams in group 5. Top two teams of ranking groups again promoted to promotion group. Top two teams of promotion group directly promoted to 2010–11 TFF Second League. The Third team was determined by extra play-offs between 3rd–5th teams of promotion group and winners of classification groups. Last three teams in groups 1–4 and last team in group 5 were relegated to Regional Amateur League.

Promotion from amateur leagues: Kırıkhanspor, Bayrampaşaspor, Çerkezköy Belediyespor, Tekirova Belediyespor, Muğlaspor, Trabzon Yalıspor.

Promotion and relegation:

2010–11 season

In 2010–11 season status of the league has been changed. League is played with 54 teams in three groups, 18 in each. The groups were determined by casting lots on a non-regional basis. The winners of each group directly promotes to TFF Second League. In each group 2nd through 5th teams play promotion play-offs to determine second team to be promoted to TFF Second League. Bottom three teams in each group were relegated to Turkish Regional Amateur League.

Promotion from amateur leagues: Sivas Dört Eylül Belediyespor, Kırklarelispor, İskenderunspor 1967, Kepez Belediyespor, Sancaktepe Belediyespor.

Promotion and relegation:

Source: Turkish Soccer and TFF league page

2011–12 season

In 2011–12 season status of the league has been changed. League is played with 57 teams in three groups, 19 in each. The groups were determined by casting lots on a non-regional basis. The winners of each group directly promotes to TFF Second League. In each group 2nd through 5th teams play promotion play-offs to determine second team to be promoted to TFF Second League. Bottom four teams in each group were relegated to Turkish Regional Amateur League.

Promotion from amateur leagues: Erzurum Büyükşehir Belediyespor, Erganispor, Beşikdüzüspor, Çarşambaspor, Elazığ Belediyespor, Manavgat Evrensekispor, Kilimli Belediyespor, Aydınspor 1923, Yeni Sandıklı Belediyespor, Maltepespor, Ümraniyespor, Küçükçekmecespor

Promotion and relegation:

2012–13 season

In 2012–13 season status of the league has been changed. League is played with 54 teams in three groups, 18 in each. The groups were determined by casting lots on a non-regional basis. The winners of each group directly promotes to TFF Second League. In each group 2nd through 5th teams play promotion play-offs to determine second team to be promoted to TFF Second League. Bottom three teams in each group are relegated to Turkish Regional Amateur League.

Promotion from Turkish Regional Amateur League: Bergama Belediyespor, Silivrispor, Kahramanmaraş Belediyespor, Kayseri Şekerspor, Çorum Belediyespor, Isparta Emrespor, Fatih Karagümrük SK, Derince Belediyespor and Refahiyespor

Promotion and relegation:

2013–14 season

In 2013–14 season league is played with 54 teams in three groups, 18 in each. 4 teams relegated from 2012–13 TFF Second League: Denizli Belediyespor, Çamlıdere Şekerspor, Ünyespor, Sakaryaspor. Eleven teams promoted from 2012–13 Turkish Regional Amateur League. The groups were determined by casting lots on a non-regional basis. The winners of each group directly promotes to TFF Second League. In each group 2nd through 5th teams play promotion play-offs to determine second team to be promoted to TFF Second League. Bottom three teams in each group are relegated to Turkish Regional Amateur League.

Promotion from Turkish Regional Amateur League: Trabzon Düzyurtspor, Yeni Diyarbakırspor, 1930 Bafraspor, Payas Belediyespor 1975, 68 Yeni Aksarayspor, Adliyespor, Kızılcabölükspor, Balçova Belediyespor, Ayvalıkgücü Belediyespor, Çıksalınspor and Tuzlaspor

Promotion and relegation:

Source: TFF Third League archive.

2014–15 season

In 2014–15 season league is played with 54 teams in three groups, 18 in each. 6 teams relegated from 2012–13 TFF Second League: Çanakkale Dardanelspor, Gaziosmanpaşaspor, Çankırıspor, Eyüpspor, İstanbul Güngörenspor and Bozüyükspor. Nine teams promoted from 2013–14 Turkish Regional Amateur League. The groups were determined by casting lots on a non-regional basis. The winners of each group directly promotes to TFF Second League. In each group 2nd through 5th teams play promotion play-offs to determine second team to be promoted to TFF Second League. Bottom three teams in each group are relegated to Turkish Regional Amateur League.

Promotion from Turkish Regional Amateur League: Bayburt İl Özel İdarespor, Erzin Belediyespor, Niğde Belediyespor, Etimesgut Belediyespor, Çine Madranspor, Tire 1922 Spor, Zonguldak Kömürspor, Çatalcaspor and Halide Edip Adıvar SK

Promotion and relegation:

2015–16 season

In 2015–16 season league is played with 57 teams in three groups, 18 in each. 6 teams relegated from 2012–13 TFF Second League: Çanakkale Dardanelspor, Gaziosmanpaşaspor, Çankırıspor, Eyüpspor, İstanbul Güngörenspor and Bozüyükspor. Nine teams promoted from 2013–14 Turkish Regional Amateur League. The groups were determined by casting lots on a non-regional basis. The winners of each group directly promotes to TFF Second League. In each group 2nd through 5th teams play promotion play-offs to determine second team to be promoted to TFF Second League. Bottom four teams in each group are relegated to Turkish Regional Amateur League. However, Cizrespor didn't field on second half matched due to operations against PKK terrorists in Cizre. For this reason, Cizrespor wasn't relegated from 3rd League.

Promotion from Turkish Regional Amateur League: Cizrespor, Yomraspor, Dersimspor, Kozan Belediyespor, Kastamonuspor 1966, Zara Belediyespor, Bodrum Belediye Bodrumspor, Manisa Büyükşehir Belediyespor, Sultanbeyli Belediyespor, Düzcespor and Tekirdağspor

Promotion and relegation:

See also
Süper Lig
TFF First League
TFF Second League
Turkish Regional Amateur League
Amatör Futbol Ligleri
Turkish Cup (since 1962-63)

Notes

References

 
Sports leagues established in 2001
2001 establishments in Turkey
4
Turk
Professional sports leagues in Turkey